Strike the Blood is an anime series adapted from the light novel series of the same title written by Gakuto Mikumo with illustrations by Manyako. The third OVA series, produced by Connect and with returning director Hideyo Yamamoto, debuted on December 19, 2018, and concluded on September 29, 2019. The opening theme song is "Blood and Emotions" by Kishida Kyōdan & The Akeboshi Rockets and the ending theme song is "Love Stoic" by Taneda.


Episode list

References

Strike the Blood episode lists
2018 Japanese television seasons
2019 Japanese television seasons